Fortune (2021 population: 1,285) is a Canadian town located in the province of Newfoundland and Labrador.

Fortune is situated on the western side of the Burin Peninsula on the island of Newfoundland and was incorporated as a town in 1945.  The town is located near the southeastern boundary of Fortune Bay. The name of the town is believed to have originated from the Portuguese word "fortuna" meaning "harbour of good fortune."

The main industry in Fortune is the ocean fishery which employs 400 residents.  The majority of species landed include cod, flounder, and haddock.

Fortune is also the nearest Canadian port for travelling to the French islands of St. Pierre and Miquelon. During the spring and summer months, a ferry connects the two islands with Fortune.

The Geological stage Fortunian - the first age of the Cambrian Period - is named after Fortune and Fortune Bay. The GSSP is nearby.

Demographics 

Notable people
 H. B. Mayo, political scientist
 Ambrose Price, interior designer and television personality

References

External links

Town of Fortune
Fortune - Encyclopedia of Newfoundland and Labrador, vol. 2, p. 337-340.

Towns in Newfoundland and Labrador
Fishing communities in Canada